Cheongju (literally "clear wine"), sometimes romanized as Chungju, is a clear, refined rice wine of Korean origin.

Names 
The word cheongju consists of two characters: cheong meaning "clear" and ju meaning "alcoholic drink". It contrasts with takju, as "tak" means "turbid". The word takju usually refers to makgeolli (milky, unrefined rice wine). The hanja characters 淸酒 are the same as the kanji pronounced seishu used on the labels of sake.

The native Korean word for "clear wine", malgeun-sul, is also used to refer to cheongju. Another name for cheongju is yakju, which literally translates into "medicinal wine".

History 
According to Things on Korea—a 12th-century book on Korea written by Song Chinese scholar Sun Mu (孫穆)—the Goryeo people used non-glutinous rice to brew rice wine. Another 12th-century Chinese book, Illustrated Account of Goryeo, reports that Korean rice wine that is made with nuruk is deeper in color and has a higher alcohol content; it says that when drinking this wine one gets drunk quickly and sobers up quickly. This book says that clear, refined rice wine was made in the royal court, while milky, unrefined rice wine was more popular among commoners.

Preparation 
Cheongju is usually brewed in winter, between the months of November and March. During the fermentation process, the rice starch becomes saccharified; the yeast fungi feed on the sugars created by saccharification and produce alcohol. The fermented wine is then filtered with yongsu (a wine strainer), which is dipped into the liquid. The clear wine inside the yongsu is ladled out to make cheongju.

Consumption 
Cheongju has been widely used in a variety of traditional rituals and rites, as it is regarded as a well-prepared alcohol.

Varieties 
Southern cities in South Korea such as Masan, Gunsan, and Nonsan are famous for producing good cheongju. Beopju brewed in Gyeongju and sogok-ju brewed in Hansan are well-known varieties of cheongju. There also are cheongju varieties made with glutinous rice or black rice.

Flavoured cheongju varieties include gukhwa-ju made with chrysanthemum, dugyeon-ju made with rhododendron, songsun-ju made with pine sprouts, yeonyeop-ju made with lotus leaves, and insam-ju made with ginseng.

Similar beverages 
Cheongju is similar to other East Asian rice wine counterparts such as the Chinese mijiu and Japanese sake. A dry white vermouth can also serve as a substitute for cheongju in cooking.

Gallery

See also 
 Gwaha-ju, fortified rice wine
 Mijiu, a Chinese equivalent of cheongju
 Sake, a Japanese equivalent of cheongju
 Korean alcoholic beverages

References 

Korean alcoholic drinks
Rice wine